The DNA Identification Act is a Canadian law that calls for the establishment of a DNA databank and allows judges to order DNA testing for criminal suspects. The Act received Royal Assent on 10 December 1998. The Act was confirmed in the 2006 R. v. Rodgers Supreme Court case.

External links
Text of the DNA Identification Act at the Ministry for Justice
http://www.canlii.org/en/ca/scc/doc/2006/2006scc15/2006scc15.html
https://web.archive.org/web/20140518213442/http://bccla.org/privacy-handbook/main-menu/privacy7contents/privacy7-10/
http://publications.gc.ca/collections/collection_2013/grc-rcmp/PS61-4-2012-eng.pdf

Canadian federal legislation
1998 in Canadian law
Canadian criminal law
Evidence law